The Roman Catholic Archdiocese of Santa Maria is an archdiocese located in the city of Santa Maria. Before being elevated to an archdiocese itself in 2011 it was part of the Ecclesiastical province of Porto Alegre in Brazil.

History
 15 August 1910: Established as Diocese of Santa Maria from the Diocese of São Pedro do Rio Grande
 13 April 2011: Elevated to archdiocese

Special churches
 Basílica Santuário Nossa Senhora Medianeira, minor basilica

Leadership
Bishops of Santa Maria
 Miguel de Lima Valverde (6 February 1911 – 10 February 1922)
 Ático Eusébio da Rocha (27 October 1922 – 17 December 1928)
 Antônio Reis (31 July 1931 – 14 September 1960)
 Luís Victor Sartori (14 September 1960 – 10 April 1970)
 Coadjutor bishop 1956–60
 Érico Ferrari (29 April 1971 – 29 April 1973)
 José Ivo Lorscheiter (5 February 1974 – 24 March 2004)
 Hélio Adelar Rubert (24 March 2004 – 13 April 2011)

Archbishops of Santa Maria
 Hélio Adelar Rubert (13 April 2011 — present)

Auxiliary bishops
João Cláudio Colling (1949-1951), appointed Bishop of Passo Fundo, Rio Grande do Sul
Walmor Battú Wichrowski (1961-1965), resigned; appointed Bishop of Cruz Alta, Rio Grande do Sul in 1971
Antônio do Carmo Cheuiche, O.C.D. (1969-1971), appointed Auxiliary Bishop of Porto Alegre, Rio Grande do Sul

Other priests of this diocese who became bishops
Edson Taschetto (Tasquetto) Damian, appointed Bishop of São Gabriel da Cachoeira, Amazonas in 2009
José Mário Scalon Angonese, appointed Auxiliary Bishop of Curitiba, Parana in 2013

Suffragan Sees 
 Diocese of Cachoeira do Sul
 Diocese of Cruz Alta
 Diocese of Santa Cruz do Sul
 Diocese of Santo Ângelo
 Diocese of Uruguaiana

References
 GCatholic.org
 Catholic Hierarchy
 Diocese website (Portuguese) 

Roman Catholic dioceses in Brazil
Christian organizations established in 1910
Roman Catholic ecclesiastical provinces in Brazil
 
Roman Catholic dioceses and prelatures established in the 20th century